Marun (also Romanized as Mārūn) is a village in Kuhestan Rural District, Rostaq District, Darab County, Fars Province, Iran. At the 2006 census, its population was 52, in 10 families.

References 

Populated places in Darab County